The Ganulu, also spelt Kanolu, were an Aboriginal Australian people of the state of Queensland.

Language

The Kanolu were often confused with the Gangulu (Kangulu), despite marked differences in their languages. For example, 'no' was kara for the former, kagu for the latter, and the Kanolu word for 'man' was mari, in contrast to the Kangulu word for the same, bama. The Ganula language is a dialect of the Bidjara language.

Country
The Kanolu were a people of the Central Highlands Region. They lived around the eastern headwaters of the Comet River from Rolleston northwards at least to Blackwater and upper Mackenzie River. Their eastern frontier lay near Dingo and Duaringa.

History of contact
Native memory spoke of many members of the people dying out around the 1830s, from a disease which affected the nose, and some members of the group were seen to bear marks that might have indicated a smallpox epidemic.

White settlement of Kanolu lands began around 1860. At the time their population was estimated at around 500. Within a decade, by 1869, their numbers had fallen to 300, and by 1879 it was thought no more than 200 survived. Thomas Josephson claimed that this drastic demographic decline was attributable to three factors. One was the effect of venereal disease introduced by settlers; secondly, consumption, and thirdly infanticide.

Lifestyle
Josephson was struck by the Kanolu's refusal to partake of pork, an introduced meat which other Aboriginal peoples were known to eat.

Alternative names
 Kanoloo.
 Kanalloo.

Some words
 wondi. (tame dog)
 kagargi. (wild dog)
 yaboo. (father)
 kika. (mother)
 koin. (whiteman)

Notes

Citations

Sources

Aboriginal peoples of Queensland
Far North Queensland